HMS Dragon was a 60-gun fourth rate ship of the line of the Royal Navy, built to the 1733 proposals of the 1719 Establishment at Woolwich Dockyard, and launched on 11 September 1736.

In February 1744, she took part in the Battle of Toulon.

Dragon was sunk in 1757 to form part of a breakwater.

Notes

References

Lavery, Brian (2003) The Ship of the Line - Volume 1: The development of the battlefleet 1650-1850. Conway Maritime Press. .

This article includes data donated from the National Maritime Museum Warship Histories project

Ships of the line of the Royal Navy
1730s ships
Ships sunk as breakwaters